Institute for Armenian Research (Ermeni Araştırmaları Enstitüsü; EREN;ERAREN) was a privately funded think tank sub-working group in Turkey established in April 2001 by the Center for Eurasian Strategic Studies.  Ömer Engin Lütem was the chairman of ERAREN. In 2009, ERAREN was dissolved. It decided to carry out its activities as Center for Eurasian Studies (AVİM).

Research

The Institute explored among others the following topics:

 Genocide Studies
 Events of 1915
 Turkish Armenian Relations
Turkey-Armenia Relations
Armenian Diapora

Publications 
 Armenian Studies (Ermeni Araştırmaları), bilingual quarterly in Turkish and English, published since 2001. 
 Review of Armenian Studies, English quarterly, published since 2002 
 Daily bulletin in Turkish and in English is published on the website.

The Institute for Armenian Research organized two conferences in Turkey, bringing together academics specialising in Armenia and the Armenian Diaspora, in April 2002 and in 2004.

Staff 
 Kamer Kasim 
 Ibrahim Kaya
 Serdar Palaybiyik
 Yıldız Deveci Bozkuş

See also 
 Center for Eurasian Strategic Studies

References

External links 
 
 Ermeni Araştırmaları

Think tanks based in Turkey
Armenian genocide denial